Zhao Guona (born 30 May 1978) is a Chinese figure skater. She competed in the ladies' singles event at the 1994 Winter Olympics.

References

1978 births
Living people
Chinese female single skaters
Olympic figure skaters of China
Figure skaters at the 1994 Winter Olympics
Place of birth missing (living people)